Zed is the pronunciation of the letter Z in Commonwealth English ("zee" in American English).

Zed or ZED may also refer to:

Entertainment

Characters
Zed (comics), a character from the Hellblazer comic series
Zed (Kiba), the main character of the anime series Kiba
Zed, a character in the comics and film Men in Black 
Zed, a character in the film Pulp Fiction
Zed, a character in the film Zardoz played by Sean Connery
Zed (Zetto), a character in the film One Piece Film: Z
Zed Necrodopolis, a main character in the film Zombies (2018 film) and it’s sequels,Zombies 2 and Zombies 3
Zed McGlunk is a character from the Police Academy movies.

Music
Zed (band), a pop-rock group from New Zealand
Zed Radio, radio station in Zaporizhzhia, Ukraine
Zeds Dead, an electronic music duo from Toronto

Other entertainment
Zed (Cirque du Soleil), a Cirque du Soleil production in Japan
Zed Group, a Spanish company that markets entertainment products to the mobile phone industry
Zed Books, an independent academic publishing company based in London
ZeD, a Canadian variety television series
Zed Plus, a 2014 Bollywood drama film directed by Chandraprakash Dwivedi

People

Given name
Zed Bias (born 1969), English musician
Zed Coston (1915-2003), American football player
Zed Key (born 2002), American basketball player
Zed Ndamane (born 1964), South African cricket umpire
Zed Al Refai (born 1966), Kuwaiti business person
Zed Saad (born 1997), Qatari footballer
Zed Seselja (born 1977), Australian politician
Zed Shaw, American software developer
Zed S. Stanton (1848-1921), American attorney and judge
Zed Ayesh (born 1968), Global Business leader, Author

Surname
David Zed (born 1960), American actor
Paul Zed (born 1956), former Liberal member of the Parliament of Canada
Gordon Penrose (aka Dr. Zed, born 1925), Canadian science educator

Other uses
Z notation, a formal specification language
Zero energy development
Zonal Employee Discount, a multilateral agreement for reduced rate personal travel by airline employees
Zed card or comp card, a "portfolio on a card" used by models and actors
Kawasaki Z series, a motorcycle series

See also
Zedd (disambiguation)
Z (disambiguation)
Zee (disambiguation)
Djed, an ancient Egyptian symbol for stability